Independent Socialists of Extremadura (SIEx) was a centre-left regionalist political party in the Spanish Autonomous Community of Extremadura.

In 2018, the majority of the party chose to join the Extremaduran PSOE

References

Political parties in Extremadura
Political parties established in 1994
Regionalist parties in Spain